Chander Kishan Daphtary (	1 April 1893 – 18 February 1983) was an Indian lawyer and was the first Solicitor General of India from 1950 to 1963. He was the Attorney General for India from 1963 to 1968. He was the President of the Bar Association of India. He was nominated to the Rajya Sabha the Upper House of Indian Parliament from 1972 to 1978. He was awarded the Padma Vibhushan in 1967

References

1893 births
1983 deaths
Nominated members of the Rajya Sabha
Recipients of the Padma Vibhushan in public affairs
20th-century Indian lawyers
India
Solicitors General of India